Central Election Commission of the Republic of Azerbaijan is a state body operating on a permanent basis in accordance with the Constitution of the Republic of Azerbaijan Republic. Mazahir Panahov is the chairman of the Commission.

Main duty 
The CEC of the Republic of Azerbaijan ensures preparation and realization of presidential elections, the elections of the members of Milli Mejlis (National Assembly) of the Republic of Azerbaijan, referendums (nationwide opinion poll) and municipal elections. The duties of commissions is carried out by the Central Election Commission of the Republic of Azerbaijan.

History 
Central Election Commission Azerbaijan SSR on Elections of People's Deputies first was established on 26 June 1990 in accordance with the decision of the Supreme Soviet of Azerbaijan SSR. It was renamed it to Central Election Commission of the Republic of Azerbaijan on 15 May 1998 according to the legislature of the Republic of Azerbaijan.

Activities and Authorities 
Central Election Commission of the Republic of Azerbaijan acts in accordance with the Election Code of the Republic of Azerbaijan;

Additionally, the Commission implementing the following tasks;

 Ensuring that voting rights of the citizens are not violated during elections and referendums;
 Preparing and then conforming the technological equipment standards required for the work of lower election commissions and supervises the implementation of those standards;
 Defining documents and their samples, election ballot papers in referendums, list of voters and other works and their compilation processes within its authority;
 Implementing certain other tasks that on the basis of Election Code of Azerbaijan;
 Organizing the establishment of single voter lists and their implementation along with corresponding executive and local self-governing entities;
 Observing processes related to the elections and referendums, improvement of election system, provision of formal notification of voters and professional training the members of the Commission;
 Announcing the results of elections and referendums and making sure that the results are published;

The Commission could adopt instructions, guidelines and regulations related to the realization of Election Code of the Republic of Azerbaijan;

The decisions and normative acts of the Commission that adopted within its authority are binding on political parties, voters, candidates (whether they are registered or not) and state bodies;

External links 
 Central Election Commission of the Republic of Azerbaijan

References 

Government agencies of Azerbaijan
Government of Azerbaijan